Harriet Marion Stephens (1823 – 1858) was an American actress and writer.
Stephens was born in Maine in 1823 to Reverend John Atwell of the Maine Methodist Conference. 
She began her career as an actress, appearing as Mrs. Rosalie Somers before taking up writing instead. Her first pieces, such as a eulogy for Edgar Allan Poe published in Godey's Lady's Book in February 1850, appeared in various periodicals. In 1853 she issued Home Scenes and Home Sounds. The novel Hagar, the Martyr appeared in print the following year (1854); a melodrama featuring a Southern heroine whose ambiguous racial identity serves as a point of tension throughout the story.  It received favorable reviews. Stephens died in East Hampton, Maine.

References

1823 births
1858 deaths
American stage actresses
19th-century American actresses
American women novelists
American women poets
19th-century American novelists
19th-century American poets
19th-century American women writers